Prince's albums discography consists of forty studio albums (including four soundtrack albums and one posthumous album), five live albums, and numerous compilations. Two albums of demo material have been released posthumously. Prince also released several albums under various group names.  See Prince singles discography for his singles and extended plays, and Prince videography for his music videos and video albums.

Prince has sold over 100 million records worldwide, including 36.5 million certified units in the United States, and over 10 million records in the United Kingdom. Rolling Stone ranked him at No. 27 on its list of the 100 Greatest Artists of All Time.

In the weeks following his death in April 2016, 19 different Prince albums charted on the Billboard 200 all at the same time, and he became the first and only artist ever to have 5 albums in the Billboard top 10 simultaneously.

Studio albums

 A With The Revolution
 B With The New Power Generation
 C With 3rdeyegirl

Posthumous albums

Studio

Demo

Live albums

 A One Nite Alone... Live! did not enter the US Billboard 200, put peaked at number 95 on the Top Album Sales component chart.
 B Up All Nite with Prince: The One Nite Alone Collection did not enter the US Billboard 200, put peaked at number 19 on the Top Album Sales component chart.

Special editions
This section contains remix albums, mixtapes and premium/special (expanded) editions from previously released albums.

 A Rave In2 the Joy Fantastic did not enter the US Billboard 200, put peaked at number 14 on the Vinyl Albums chart.
 B Ultimate Rave did not enter the US Billboard 200, put peaked at number 69 on the Top Album Sales component chart.

Compilation albums

 A Anthology: 1995–2010 did not enter the US Billboard 200, put peaked at number 85 on the Current Album Sales component chart.

Internet albums
This section lists albums that have only been made available for download on the internet.

Albums credited to Madhouse

Albums credited to The New Power Generation

Albums credited to The NPG Orchestra

References

Bibliography

External links
 Guide2Prince Worldwide Prince discography
 Review of Prince's albums
 
 The Digital Garden List of unofficial Prince recordings

Discographies of American artists
Pop music discographies
Rhythm and blues discographies
Rock music discographies
Soul music discographies